18F is a digital services agency within the Technology Transformation Services department of the General Services Administration (GSA) of the United States Government. Their purpose is to deliver digital services and technology products.

Overview
18F is an office of federal employees within the General Services Administration (GSA) that collaborates with other agencies to improve the user experience of government services by helping them build and buy technology. The group works with government organizations to define a strategy and work towards a solution for their modernization efforts. 18F uses agile and lean methodologies, open source code, and user centered design approaches. 18F was co-founded on March 19, 2014 by former Presidential Innovation Fellows Greg Godbout, Aaron Snow, and Hillary Hartley.

Its name refers to its office location in northwest Washington, D.C., on 18th and F Streets. 18F is within Technology Transformation Services, part of the Federal Acquisition Service. In addition to its Washington, D.C office, the agency has offices in New York, San Francisco, and Chicago.

History
In March 2014, a group of Presidential Innovation Fellows started 18F to extend their efforts to improve and modernize government technology.

The United Kingdom had created a similar agency in April 2011, Government Digital Service, following their own healthcare IT issues, which saves an estimated $20 million a year over previous methods. 18F runs on a cost recovery model where client agencies reimburse the digital agency for its work. Their operation is closer to a traditional business than government organizations like the Digital Services Innovation Center.

18F's creation was announced by GSA Administrator Dan Tangherlini on March 19, 2014 with a mission to simplify the government's digital services, but no project-specific directive. The agency started with 15 employees, including 11 former Presidential Innovation Fellows from both the private and public sectors. The staff previously worked in front and backend development, design and usability, and product management. The Verge Adrienne Jeffries reported that the agency released a GSA website code update in a half hour, which would normally take weeks or longer. She added that the team did not appear equipped to handle a rollout similar to that of HealthCare.gov.

Upon its opening, 18F began to host the Presidential Innovation Fellows program that had started in May 2012, before 18F's own inception, in the Digital Government Strategy. An initial list of projects was to be drafted in the months following the agency's creation. A possible program called FBOpen, an open source small business and federal contractor interface for bidding on government contracts, was discussed at a Senate Homeland Security and Government Affairs hearing.

On March 19, 2015, 18F and collaborators launched analytics.usa.gov. On September 12, 2015, the group launched the College Scorecard. Other projects of 18F have included myRA for the U.S. Department of the Treasury, Every Kid in a Park for the U.S. Department of the Interior, and MyUSA for the General Services Administration, in addition to redesigned websites for the PeaceCorps and Federal Election Commission. All of its projects are open source, meaning anyone can review and suggest updates to the code.

The existence of the agency in general and such projects in particular has led to resistance from established government IT firms. In addition, the agency faces the additional challenge of staying fiscally solvent. According to a recent GAO report, 18F is currently spending on average more than $1 million per month more than it recovers. In 2016 alone, the group will receive approximately $33 million for its services, but will spend almost $48 million. 18F is not expected to break even.

The following is an update to cost recovery based on FY19 data and was taken from Congressional testimony:
“From a FY19 financial standpoint, 18F’s net operating loss was approximately $600k, which translated into an improvement of over $5m from FY18. The loss in FY19 was primarily attributable to the loss of approximately $1.3m in revenue during the government shutdown and limited opportunity to offset costs during this period. Billable utilization rates for 18F increased by 6.6% in FY19 from FY18 and was a primary factor in improved profitability.”

See also
 Civic technology
 Service design
 United States Digital Service, at the Executive Office of the President
 Government Digital Service, for the UK's counterpart

References

External links

 "The Changelog #230: 18F and OSS in the U.S. Federal Government". 2016-11-25.

General Services Administration
Government agencies established in 2014
Organizations based in Washington, D.C.
2014 establishments in the United States
Federal government of the United States